London 2 North is a Tier 6 English Rugby Union League. It is the other half of 'London 2' Leagues (the other being London 2 South).

References

6
Rugby union leagues in London